Zuboff, is a surname, a transliteration variant of the Russian surname Zubov, originating from the Russian word zub (tooth). Notable people with the surname include:

 Arnold Zuboff (born 1946), American philosopher
 Shoshana Zuboff (born 1951), American author and scholar

See also
 Zubof Rock, island near Alaska

Russian-language surnames